Trifolium jokerstii is a rare species of clover known by the common names Jim's clover and Butte County golden clover. It is endemic to Butte County, California, where it is known from eight or nine occurrences near Oroville. It grows in seasonally moist habitat, such as vernal pools, pastures, and ephemeral creeks. It was previously included within the description of Trifolium barbigerum as an odd yellow-flowered variant of a mostly purple-pink-flowered species, and was elevated to species status in 1998. It was named for the California botanist Jim Jokerst.

This is an annual herb with a decumbent or erect, hairless stem. The leaves are made up of oval blades up to about 3 centimeters long which are marked with a white or purplish chevron, and large, lance-shaped, toothed stipules. The inflorescence is a head of at least five golden yellow flowers on a bowl-like base of bracts.

References

External links
 Calflora: Trifolium jokerstii (Jim's clover)
Jepson Manual eFlora (TJM2) treatment of Trifolium jokerstii
Species Accounts: Butte County Golden Clover
UC CalPhotos gallery: Trifolium jokerstii

jokerstii
Endemic flora of California
Natural history of Butte County, California
Natural history of the Central Valley (California)
Plants described in 1998
Critically endangered flora of California